University of Tabuk is located in Tabuk, Saudi Arabia, founded in 2006.

UT is home to a number of research centers and institutes, including the Prince Fahd Bin Sultan Research Chair for Renewable Energy, the King Abdullah Bin Abdulaziz Chair for Research and Studies in Entrepreneurship, and the Center for Environmental Studies.

UT also offers a variety of undergraduate and graduate programs in various disciplines such as engineering, computer science, business administration, law, education, and health sciences.

Tabuk University Mosque
Tabuk University Mosque is one of the most famous sites in the region.

References

External links 
University of Tabuk Website

Universities and colleges in Saudi Arabia
Educational institutions established in 2007
2007 establishments in Saudi Arabia